The Vines are an Australian rock band formed in Sydney in 1994. Their sound has been described as a musical hybrid of 1960s garage rock and 1990s alternative rock. The band has been through several line-up changes, with vocalist/guitarist Craig Nicholls serving as the sole constant throughout the band's history.

The Vines' success in the Australian recording industry resulted in winning the ARIA Award for Breakthrough Artist – Single for "Get Free" and receiving five other nominations for their debut album Highly Evolved, plus two further nominations in subsequent years. In 2003, the album went platinum in Australia, and since then the band has released four albums and a best-of compilation from their time at Capitol Records. The Vines have released seven studio albums to date.

History

1994–2000: Formation and early years 
The original line-up of Rishikesh formed in Sydney in 1994 when vocalist and lead guitarist Craig Nicholls and bass guitarist Patrick Matthews met whilst working at their local McDonald's in the suburb of South Hurstville, New South Wales. They were soon joined by Matthews' school friend David Olliffe on drums. The name "Rishikesh", suggested by Olliffe, refers to the Indian city where the Beatles visited an ashram in 1968. The local newspapers regularly misprinted the name as "Rishi Chasms", so Nicholls suggested a new name, "the Vines", as an homage to his father, who fronted a local band called the Vynes. The group started performing Nirvana and You Am I covers at backyard parties while developing their sound on Nicholls' four-track recorder.

Over the next few years, the Vines gigged infrequently and remained relatively unknown, even in their hometown, yet by the beginning of 2001 they had amassed a repertoire of over thirty songs. On the strength of their demo, Rex Records put out what was to be their first single, "Factory", as a limited seven-inch single. The release became NME's Single of the Week in November 2001.

2001–2003: Highly Evolved

In July 2001, the band flew to Los Angeles to start recording their debut album, Highly Evolved, with Rob Schnapf. David Olliffe was replaced a few months later as a result of increasing record company interest, and the band had sessions with drummers such as Joey Waronker.

Their debut single, "Factory" was released in November 2001 in the UK and gained a good response in the press, with the NME describing their garage rock sound as "of the oldest school". The band then signed to Heavenly Records in the UK in December 2001 and EMI in Australia in April 2002. The single "Highly Evolved" earned them more critical acclaim as NME made it a single of the week in March 2002. The single charted in the UK at number 32 on the singles chart and on Australia's ARIAnet top 100 singles chart.

The band appeared on the cover of Rolling Stone in October 2002 (the first Australian band to do so since Men at Work in 1983) with the words "Rock is Back: Meet the Vines" boldly emblazoned underneath. Referred to as the 'The' bands, the Strokes, the Hives, the White Stripes, and the Vines combined "old fashioned punk and adrenaline fuelled riffs" to be ushered in at the beginning of 2002 as the "saviors of rock".

The release of the album saw more critical success, with the band appearing on the cover of NME. The album reached number 11 in the U.S. Billboard Hot 100 albums chart. The band played high-profile slots on the Late Show with David Letterman and the MTV Video Music Awards. Several more singles were released from the album, including "Get Free" and "Outtathaway!". A fourth single, "Homesick", was released in Australia only. The band won the ARIA Award for Breakthrough Artist – Single for "Get Free" in 2002, and were nominated for five other awards. Highly Evolved sold 1.5 million copies throughout the world with distribution through Capitol Records. By end of 2003, the album went platinum in Australia.

Craig Nicholls realised while touring for the promotion of their debut album, Highly Evolved (July 2002), that they needed an additional guitarist. So Nicholls asked his longtime friend and schoolmate Ryan Griffiths to join.

In May 2003, the band went into a studio in Woodstock, New York with Rob Schnapf again on production. While Craig Nicholls had talked of having a highly produced album, he told the Australian edition of Rolling Stone in March 2004 that they decided to stick to a less-is-more philosophy. "I wanted it to be – in my head – something grand, with big ideas and that vision sort of thing. But at the same time, that doesn't mean that something can't be special if it's just simple. Because I think that the songs are the main thing".

2004–2005: Winning Days

Their second album, Winning Days, was released on 29 March 2004 and rose to number 23 in the US. "Ride" and "Winning Days" were released as singles in Australia (where they did not chart) and the UK.

2006–2007: Vision Valley

In mid-2005, the group announced they were working on their third album, with producer Wayne Connolly. Andy Kent of fellow Australian band You Am I filled in on bass playing duties. In November of that year, the band's management announced they had finished recording all the songs that would appear on the album.

"Don't Listen to the Radio" was released as the album's first single, and was made available for digital download on 7 March on iTunes. The song was used on the soundtrack for the video game FlatOut 2. "Gross Out" was made available for digital download on 18 March, and was the first song leaked from the album. Vision Valley was released on 1 April 2006 in Australia, 3 April in Europe, and 4 April in the United States.

Vision Valley consisted of short, immediate songs; the album running little over 30 minutes in length. "Anysound" was the second official single from the album, and an animated music video was released exclusively through YouTube. The song was included as a track heard on the in-game radio in the 2007 LucasArts published Thrillville: Off The Rails. "Dope Train" was released as a third single, with a music video composed of live footage of the band from Big Day Out in 2007.

On 19 July 2006, the Vines played a gig at the Annandale Hotel under the name "Joe Dirt", with a new bassist, Brad Heald, after Patrick Matthews departed the group. Matthews had left in response to an outburst Nicholls had while the group played a promotional show for Triple M radio.

2008: Melodia

In 2007, the Vines signed to Ivy League Records for an Australian album deal. The first single preceding the album Melodia was "He's a Rocker", which was released through iTunes on 3 June 2008 along with two bonus tracks. "MerryGoRound" was released as a follow-up single for radio airplay in Australia during August 2008. "MerryGoRound" only received support and backing from Triple J radio. "Get Out" was released as the third single from Melodia in September 2008 for radio airplay, and a music video was released to coincide with the release of "Get Out" as a single by Ivy League Records on YouTube. "Get Out" was featured on the in-game soundtrack of Midnight Club: Los Angeles released in late October 2008 on Xbox 360 and PlayStation 3 gaming platforms.

In October 2008, the Vines commenced a national Australian tour in support of Melodia, playing small venues throughout Australia. In November 2008, the Vines were announced as being part of the line-up for the 2009 Australian Big Day Out, but the band cancelled.

2009–2012: Future Primitive

On 14 November 2009, the Vines played at the Annandale Hotel, under the alias of the Crimes. They had a support slot with You Am I, playing their back catalogue and a new song from an album due in 2011.

The Vines recorded in early 2010. They also played gigs that year, including a set at the Annandale Hotel on 23 June where they debuted new songs "Future Primitive", "Gimme Love", and "Black Dragon". They also played Splendour in the Grass on 1 August and Singfest, a Singapore music festival on 5 August. At the start of September, they supported Powderfinger at the first four shows of their farewell tour.

A music video for "Gimme Love" wrapped filming on 1 March 2011, with the completed video surfacing online through YouTube on 27 March. The music video pays homage to the 2010 film Scott Pilgrim vs. the World.{{Quote box |quoted=true |bgcolor=#FFFFF0 |salign=right |quote=It's cool that we're still together and that we got through it all, all the hard times and all the ups and downs. I know a lot of other bands have split, but I guess I just don't know what else I would do if I wasn't doing this. – 'Craig Nicholls May 2011.|align=right|width=30em }}

Over a year after its completion, Future Primitive received an official release date through The Daily Telegraph on 3 June 2011. Because the Vines did not have a label at the time of recording, the band members funded the album's recording themselves. Upon the album's completion, the band approached various record labels to see if any were interested in signing the band for its release, explaining the year-long delay between recording and release.

In May 2011, the Vines played on-stage with the Dandy Warhols at the Enmore Theatre in Sydney for the song "It's a Fast-Driving Rave-Up with The Dandy Warhols". The two bands had previously had dinner at the Warhols' studio The Odditorium in 2004, along with the bands Jet and the Strokes.

In an interview with Music Feeds at Splendour in the Grass 2011, Nicholls talked about a late 2011 or early 2012 release date for their still unnamed sixth album.
On 26 November 2011, rumours on the band's Facebook page suggested that the band had "pushed out" two of its members. At the 2011 Homebake music festival, the Vines emerged on the main-stage as a three piece, consisting of Nicholls, Heald and drummer Murray Sheridan. The departure of both Griffiths and Rosser was confirmed by Channel V presenter Jane Gazzo, who wrote that the two had been "sacked" in a Twitter post.

Craig's sister, Jess Nicholls, also confirmed their departure via the band's official forum. "If any of you were at Homebake yesterday, I'm sure you can agree the set was amazing and sounded better than ever," she wrote. "The band has made a creative decision to revert back to a three piece, as they originally started. I know you will probably have a lot of questions but just wanted to say don't fear, this is in no way the end of the Vines!!" Nicholls, Heald and Sheridan performed again at Southbound music festival in Perth on 8 January 2012.

On 16 March 2012, Rosser announced that he had joined Australian rock band Wolfmother, as their new drummer, on the Faster Louder website. He also claimed that the band had "broken up," although "Craig [Nicholls] will always write great music in the future and he may choose to carry on under the Vines' name."

2012–2015: Wicked Nature

On 30 March 2012, the Vines' Facebook page changed its profile picture to a single previously unseen promotional photo of Nicholls, implying that he was the only remaining member of the band. Heald confirmed his departure from the band in 2012. A new line-up, consisting of Nicholls, drummer Lachlan West and bassist Tim John, entered the studio to record their sixth album on 20 August 2012 in Sydney's 301 Studio and completed the mixing of the album at the end of 2012.

On 18 April 2013, the band's management, Parker & Mr French, announced via their Tumblr page that "the new record from the Vines is definitely on the way". Additionally, "2013 has the Vines sixth album in the incubator and an announcement coming about a new and the first collaborative side project from Craig Nicholls." was written on the band's own section of the Parker & Mr French Tumblr page.

West revealed in a June 2013 interview with his other band, Something With Numbers, that two producers have worked on the forthcoming Vines release. Paul McKercher produced the first half of the record and Lachlan Mitchell, who also produced the latest Something With Numbers record, worked on the second half based upon West's recommendation to Nicholls. The article also stated that the new Vines album was "due for release in the latter half of this year (2013)". However, the year passed with no new material from the band or news as to when the album would be released.

On 3 June 2014, a new press shot featuring the new line-up was uploaded to the band's official Facebook page, as well as a new cover photo containing an updated version of the band's original logo.
According to a June 2014 Faster Louder article, in addition to the anticipated sixth album, a seventh album was recorded with the new line-up.

At the beginning of July 2014, the Vines created a PledgeMusic page for their sixth record Wicked Nature, a double album which was released on 2 September 2014. The lead single "Metal Zone" was released on 14 July. Its music video premiered on Noisy on 11 July.

In spring of 2015, it was announced that Craig Nicholls started a side project called White Shadows, which focused on electronic music. A debut album for the project, titled Secret of Life, was later released that year. Its lead single, "Give Up Give Out Give In", was released on 9 April 2015 with a music video produced. The album featured over 70 different guest musicians.

2016–2018: In Miracle Land and classic line-up reunion

On 25 March 2016, the band changed their profile picture on Facebook to the band's logo.  Along with this came a new post featuring a picture of Craig Nicholls in the studio playing guitar with the caption "Album #7 coming soon..." On 1 April 2016, the first single "In Miracle Land" was released.

In October 2016, the band played three shows in Australia for the 'In Miracle Land' Tour in support of the upcoming album of the same name. During the tour, the band debuted new songs "Hate the Sound", "I Wanna Go Down", "Broken Heart", "Sky Gazer" and "Gone Wander". The title track has yet to be performed live.

In June 2017, it was announced that Highly Evolved was to be reissued on vinyl to coincide with its 15th anniversary.

In May 2018, The Vines' official Facebook page announced that The Vines would be joining Jet as the opener for the two Sydney dates of their Get Born anniversary tour. With the announcement came the news that the shows would be with the line-up of Nicholls, Matthews, Griffiths and Rosser. The shows marked Matthews' first with The Vines in 14 years, and the first in seven years for Griffiths and Rosser.

On 31 May 2018, it was announced via Facebook that the album In Miracle Land would be released 29 June 2018. It featured the same line-up as Wicked Nature. The Vines have not performed live or given any updates on the band since late 2018.

In December 2021, Australian producer Ryan Miller – who produced In Miracle Land – confirmed via Instagram that he is working on a new record with Nicholls. It is currently unknown whether this will be a solo record from Nicholls, or a new record under The Vines' name.
To date, Ryan Miller shared snippets of two new songs by Craig Nicholls, but declared that the material is "out of his hands".
There are no official plans for a release yet.

 Musical style 

Ex-bassist Matthews believed that Winning Days was a step in a different direction for the band. "The themes are more introspective and less wild rock'n'roll". Their music also was described by Chart Attack as having "neo-psychedelic arrangements".

 Reception 
Upon the release of their debut album, the Vines were hailed as "the second coming of Nirvana" by the British press; their grungy sound was considered reminiscent of the Seattle scene circa 1991 and Nicholls' erratic on-stage behaviour and raw vocals drew comparisons between him and Kurt Cobain. Highly Evolved became a huge success and their accompanying live shows in the early years were praised as "electrifying" and "sensational".

Critical reactions to 2004's Winning Days were mixed. Pitchfork's Chris Ott described it as being "nothing more than boring and harmlessly vapid" and showing "only mild promise". Conversely, Rolling Stone' David Fricke said it was "a leap forward in style and frenzy".

In June 2021, Double J's Al Newstead wrote an op-ed in support of the band. "Their legacy isn’t clean cut," he wrote, "but it’s still remarkable to see what The Vines achieved, and chiefly what Nicholls survived."

Activism
In 2006, the Vines created a decorated heart card to benefit PETA. In 2007, the group joined the organisation in calling for an end to Canada's seal hunt.

Band members
Current members
 Craig Nicholls – lead vocals, lead guitar (1994–present)

Former members
 David Olliffe – drums (1994–2002)
 Patrick Matthews – bass guitar, backing vocals (1994–2004, 2018)
 Hamish Rosser – drums, backing vocals (2002–2011, 2018)
 Ryan Griffiths – rhythm guitar, backing vocals (2002–2011, 2018)
 Brad Heald – bass guitar, backing vocals (2006–2012)
 Lachlan West – drums, backing vocals (2012–2018)
 Tim John – bass guitar, backing vocals (2012–2018)

Former session/touring musicians
 Andy Kent – bass guitar (2006)
 Murray Sheridan – drums (2011–2012)

Timeline

Discography

 Highly Evolved (2002)
 Winning Days (2004)
 Vision Valley (2006)
 Melodia (2008)
 Future Primitive (2011)
 Wicked Nature (2014)
 In Miracle Land (2018)

Awards and nominations
ARIA Music Awards
The ARIA Music Awards is an annual awards ceremony that recognises excellence, innovation, and achievement across all genres of Australian music. They commenced in 1987.

! 
|-
| rowspan="6"| 2002
| rowspan="2"| "Get Free"
| ARIA Award for Breakthrough Artist - Single
| 
| rowspan="6"|
|-
| ARIA Award for Single of the Year
| 
|-
| rowspan="3"| Highly Evolved| ARIA Award for Breakthrough Artist - Album
| 
|-
| ARIA Award for Best Rock Album
| 
|-
| ARIA Award for Best Group
| 
|-
| Craig Nicholls for The Vines' Highly Evolved| ARIA Award for Best Cover Art
| 
|-
| 2004
| James Bellesini and Love Police – The Vines Winning Days''
| ARIA Award for Best Cover Art
| 
| 
|-

References

1999 establishments in Australia
ARIA Award winners
Australian garage rock groups
Post-punk revival music groups
Capitol Records artists
Musical groups established in 1999
Musical groups from Sydney
Australian musical trios